Richard Murray Vaughan (March 2, 1965 – October 2020) was a Canadian writer and artist.

Biography
Born in Saint John, New Brunswick, Vaughan graduated from the creative writing program at the University of New Brunswick. He was playwright-in-residence at Buddies in Bad Times in 1994-95, and has published numerous works, including poetry, fiction, stage plays and journalism for Utne Reader, Xtra! and The Globe and Mail. He was openly gay.

His 2015 book Bright Eyed is a memoir of his struggles with insomnia.

In October 2020 he was reported missing in Fredericton, New Brunswick, where he was working as writer in residence at the University of New Brunswick. Vaughan was found dead by Fredericton Police on October 23, 2020.

Works
 The InCorrupt Tables (Wild East/Salamanca Chapbooks, 1992 (reprinted 1995), poetry)
 William Forrestali's (Muted) Cornucopia (Studio 21 Halifax, 1992, art catalogue)
 Beyond Bad Times (Snowapple Press, 1993, anthology)
 Expressions: Writing About Psychiatric Survival (Expressions Press, 1993, anthology)
 Shout and Speak Out Loud: Atlantic Canadians on Child Sexual Abuse (Wild East, 1993, anthology)
 Semiotext(e) CANADAS (Semiotext(e) Publications, 1994, anthology)
 Plush (Coach House Press, 1995, anthology)
 Symbiosis: The Clinic (Symbiosis Collective, 1995, art catalogue)
 The Last Word (Insomniac Press, 1995, anthology)
 a selection of dazzling scarves (ECW Press, 1996, poetry)
 DISCovering Authors: Canadian Series (Gale Research, 1996, CD Rom)
 Carnival: A Scream In High Park Reader (Insomniac Press, 1996, anthology)
 Painted, Tainted, Sainted by Sky Gilbert (PUC Press, 1996, introduction)
 Blues and True Concussions: 6 New Poets (House of Anansi, 1996, anthology)
 To Monsieur Desmoulins... (Tortoise Shell and Black, 1997, poetry chapbook)
 Gay Love Poetry (Robinson Publishing U.K. 1997, anthology)
 The Ecstatic Moment: The Best of Libido (Dell Books, 1997, anthology)
 96 Tears (in my jeans) (Broken Jaw Press, 1998, poetry chapbook)
 A Quilted Heart (Insomniac Press, 1998, novel)
 Contra/Dictions: Queer Male Fiction (Arsenal Pulp Press, 1998, anthology).
 Written in the Skin (Insomniac Press, 1998, anthology)
 Rhubarb-O-Rama! (Blizzard Press, 1998, anthology of plays)
 Restless Requiem: Catherine Hale's Seductive Altars (Art Centre, University of New Brunswick Press, 1998, art catalogue)
 Invisible to Predators (ECW Press, 1999, poetry)
 Camera, Woman (2001, drama)
 Spells (2003, novel)
 The Monster Trilogy (2003, drama)
 Ruined Stars (2004, poetry)
 Troubled: A Memoir in Poems (2008, poetry)
 Bright Eyed (2015, memoir)
 
 
Compared to Hitler (Tightrope Books, 2013, selected essays)

References

External links
 

1965 births
2020 deaths
Canadian memoirists
Canadian male novelists
Canadian male poets
Canadian newspaper journalists
Canadian magazine journalists
20th-century Canadian poets
21st-century Canadian poets
20th-century Canadian dramatists and playwrights
21st-century Canadian dramatists and playwrights
20th-century Canadian novelists
21st-century Canadian novelists
Canadian gay writers
Canadian LGBT dramatists and playwrights
Canadian LGBT poets
Canadian LGBT novelists
Gay memoirists
Chapbook writers
Writers from Saint John, New Brunswick
Writers from Toronto
University of New Brunswick alumni
Canadian male dramatists and playwrights
20th-century Canadian male writers
21st-century Canadian male writers
Canadian male non-fiction writers
Gay poets
Gay dramatists and playwrights
Gay novelists
21st-century Canadian LGBT people
20th-century Canadian LGBT people